Selim Ay (born 31 July 1991) is a Turkish footballer who plays as a centre back for TFF First League club Altınordu on loan from Çaykur Rizespor. He made his Süper Lig debut on 17 August 2013 against Fenerbahçe.

Honours 
Konyaspor
Turkish Cup: 2016–17

References

External links
 Selim Ay at TFF.org
 
 

1991 births
Living people
Sportspeople from Antalya
Turkish footballers
Turkey youth international footballers
Konyaspor footballers
Süper Lig players
Association football central defenders